Big Bar Ferry is a cable ferry across the Fraser River in British Columbia, Canada.
The ferry connects the dirt ranch road up the west side of the Fraser from Lillooet to Big Bar and Kostering, which connect via road to Jesmond and Big Bar Lake, and beyond to BC Highway 97.

Description
Technically, the ferry is a reaction ferry, which is propelled by the current of the water. An overhead cable is suspended from towers anchored on either bank of the river, and a "traveller" is installed on the cable. The ferry is attached to the traveller by a bridle cable. To operate the ferry, rudders are used to ensure that the pontoons are angled into the current, causing the force of the current to move the ferry across the river. 

The ferry operates under contract to the British Columbia Ministry of Transportation, is free of tolls, and runs on demand between 0700 and 1900. It carries a maximum of 2 cars and 12 passengers at a time. At times of low/high water, or ice in the river, the ferry is replaced by an aerial tramway that carries passengers only.

See also
Low Bar Ferry
Lytton Ferry
List of crossings of the Fraser River

References

Fraser Canyon
Ferries of British Columbia
Crossings of the Fraser River
Cable ferries in Canada